The Rundown (known internationally as Welcome to the Jungle) is a 2003 American buddy action comedy film directed by Peter Berg and written by James Vanderbilt and R.J. Stewart. It stars Dwayne Johnson (credited as The Rock), Seann William Scott, Christopher Walken, Rosario Dawson and William Lucking. In the film, Johnson plays a bounty hunter who travels to Brazil to retrieve his employer's son (Scott). The film was released by Universal Pictures in North America and Japan and by Columbia TriStar Film Distributors International under the Columbia Pictures label internationally on September 26, 2003 and made $80.9 million on an $85 million budget.

Plot 
Beck is a "retrieval expert", a bounty hunter who collects debts for a man named Billy Walker.  He is sent to a nightclub to retrieve a championship ring from a football player, and after doing so is assaulted by one of Walker's other collectors.  Angry, he confronts Walker and tells him that he wants out of the business. Walker talks him into one last bounty – retrieve Walker's son Travis from a small mining town in Brazil and Walker will give him enough money to open his own restaurant.  Beck accepts and leaves for Brazil.  When Beck arrives in the town of El Dorado, he meets with the man running the mining operation, Cornelius Hatcher.  Hatcher gives Beck his blessing to grab Travis, but reneges when he finds out that Travis has discovered a missing golden artifact called "O Gato do Diabo” (The Devil's Cat).  Hatcher and his men confront Beck in the local bar, but he manages to leave with Travis.  On the way back to the airfield, Travis forces their Jeep off the road and into the jungle.  Travis attempts to escape but is re-captured by Beck.  After an unfortunate encounter with some local monkeys, the two find themselves in the camp of the local resistance movement.

At the resistance camp, Travis convinces the rebels that Beck works for Hatcher and was sent to kill them all. After a prolonged fight, Beck gains the upper hand before the rebel leader Mariana intervenes. She wants the Gato so it can be used to ensure the locals can free themselves from Hatcher. Hatcher and his men suddenly attack the camp, killing many rebels. Beck, Travis, and Mariana escape the camp and Beck makes Mariana a deal – she helps him get Travis to the airfield in exchange for the Gato.  After some searching, Travis leads them to a cave behind a waterfall where the Gato is located.  They retrieve it and begin the journey back.

On the way back, Mariana chastises Travis for wanting to sell the artifact, but Travis argues that he actually did want to give it to a museum. Mariana gives the two men a toxic fruit that temporarily paralyzes them. She tells Beck which direction the airfield is, and leaves them with a fire to keep the animals away. After waking up able to move, Beck hauls Travis to the airfield. The local pilot, Declan, tells Beck that Mariana was captured earlier by Hatcher and will probably be killed. Travis pleads with Beck to help, and the two head into town to rescue her. Using a cow stampede for cover, the two begin their assault on Hatcher's goons. Travis becomes trapped by gunfire in a bus, and Beck saves him before the bus explodes.  Hatcher tells his brother to take Mariana and the Gato and flee, but they are stopped by Travis. Hatcher confronts Beck, who offers him the chance to leave town, which Hatcher initially refuses. After he is shot by the townspeople, Hatcher agrees to leave town, but eventually dies from his gunshot wounds. Travis gives the Gato to Mariana before leaving with Beck, who tells him that despite all they've been through he must still return Travis to the United States.

Back in Los Angeles, Travis is delivered to his father who begins to verbally and physically abuse him. Beck asks to celebrate with them and gives Walker and his men the same fruit Mariana used on him. As they are paralyzed, Beck uncuffs Travis and the duo leave together.

Cast 

 Dwayne Johnson as Beck, a skilled bounty hunter who longs to quit the business and start a career as a chef.  
 Seann William Scott as Travis Walker, a treasure hunter who is searching El Dorado for a lost artifact.  
 Rosario Dawson as Mariana, the town bartender who is also the secret leader of the local resistance against Hatcher.  
 Christopher Walken as Cornelius Bernard Hatcher, the owner of the mining operation and founder of the town of El Dorado.
 Ewen Bremner as Declan, the Scottish pilot who operates out of the town airstrip.  
 Jon Gries as Harvey Hatcher, Cornelius' younger brother and co-owner of the mine. He enforces his brother's orders and commands the security forces.   
 Ernie Reyes, Jr. as Manito, a resistance fighter who engages Beck in a prolonged fight using his skill in capoeira.
 William Lucking as Billy Walker, a loan shark and bookie who uses Beck to collect debts.
 Antonio Muñoz as Kontiki Rebel
 Stephen Bishop as Knappmiller, a football player who owes Billy money from gambling debts.
 Arnold Schwarzenegger as Bar Patron (uncredited cameo)

Production 
The movie was originally called Helldorado. It was offered to Peter Berg, who had made one film, Very Bad Things. Looking for inspiration on how to do it, Berg bought a DVD titled "The Fifty Best Fights Ever Filmed". At first he says watching it made him depressed. "I just thought, 'Good God, it's all been done and it's all been done so well, probably with more money than I'm going to have," Berg said. "What am I going to do?" Then he saw the fight between Roddy Piper and Keith David in They Live. "It just hurt watching it," Berg says. "It was a completely different style from all these sexy and sleek movies. And thinking about it, I couldn't remember the last time in a movie fight where I felt the pain, where if you got hit in the face, it hurt. So that's where I found my breathing room: Let's give people old-school guys slugging it out with big punches."

Producer Kevin Misher called the film "Indiana Jones and the Lost Ark" meets "Romancing the Stone" with a little bit of "Midnight Run".

Johnson was paid $12.5 million for the film. "This movie could have been a dark, vicious action thriller," said Berg. "But the fact that it's playful and funny is a tribute to The Rock. He's a charming, charismatic and very smart man."

Berg and producer Kevin Misher were held up by armed robbers in Brazil in June 2002 while scouting locations. This meant they decided to film in Hawaii instead. Shooting began September 2002. "We just basically made up as we went along," said Scott.

One scene on Oahu involved Johnson and Scott falling down the side of a mountain. "The goal was to put the biggest fall down a hill in a movie that people have ever seen," said Berg. "The big inspiration was the old 'Wide World of Sports' - 'and the agony of defeat' - and wondering what would have happened if that poor bastard on the ski slope had had a few more stages to go," it became a question of finding the stuntmen." Johnson's regular stuntman refused to do the stunt, so they hired "a guy who has a reputation for just doing anything," said Berg. The new stuntman was knocked out the first time.

Arnold Schwarzenegger made a cameo in the film. He visited Universal Studios during the shoot and was having lunch with the Rock. Berg asked if he would like to appear in the film, and Schwarzenegger agreed if they could do it then. "Within 15 minutes, we were on the set," said Berg. This is the last time Schwarzenegger has appeared in a film distributed by Universal Pictures.

Reception

Box office 
Despite the positive reviews, The Rundown was a significant box office failure, grossing just under $81 million worldwide compared to its $85 million budget, which makes a sequel not entirely likely. Director Peter Berg has expressed interest in making a sequel to the film but notes that "no one can ever get motivated and focused enough to do it."

Critical response 
On the review aggregator website Rotten Tomatoes, the film holds an approval rating of 69% based on 153 reviews, with an average rating of 6.3/10. The website's critical consensus states, "The Rundown doesn't break any new ground, but it's a smart, funny buddy action picture with terrific comic chemistry between Dwayne 'The Rock' Johnson and Seann William Scott." At Metacritic, the film has a weighted average score of 59 out of 100 based on 36 critics, indicating "mixed or average reviews". 

Roger Ebert of the Chicago Sun-Times gave the film 3 stars out of 4, saying "The jungle locations give the film a texture and beauty that underlines the out-sized characters."

Possible sequel 
In December 2009, Berg acknowledged that discussions for a sequel had begun shortly after the film's release and were ongoing. The filmmaker cited scheduling conflicts as the reason why the project hadn't been green-lit yet. By November 2010, Dwayne Johnson corroborated this; stating that he and Berg are always discussing options for a second film. Johnson stated that the pair are also in negotiations with Universal Pictures, and that if a good enough story is written the film will be made.

In December 2013, Berg announced that he was officially developing a second Rundown film. The filmmaker confirmed that Dwayne Johnson also was invested in a sequel, while stating that Scott would not return in his co-starring role. A number of unnamed screenwriters were hired for the project, by the filmmaker. By September 2016, Berg stated that the script for the sequel had been written with Kevin Hart in mind as the co-star, while also stating that he would also consider making the film with Jonah Hill alternatively in the supporting role. Johnson publicly confirmed his involvement with the project, while proposing HellDorado - which was the working title of the first movie - as a possible title for the sequel. The pair asked fans to campaign for Hill to sign on as co-star. In August 2018, the Berg revealed that the current draft of the script included a story that took place in Alaska with a comedic scene involving walruses, similar to the scene with baboons from the first movie. Acknowledging Johnson's disinterest in the ice-covered state, the filmmaker stated that a new draft is being written with a less frigid location being considered for the plot.

In September 2020, Berg stated that development for a sequel is ongoing, while citing Johnson's busy production schedule as one of the reasons the film hasn't been made yet. The filmmaker also stated that they are currently "rethink[ing] the script".

See also 
 List of American films of 2003
 Dwayne Johnson filmography
 Arnold Schwarzenegger filmography

References

External links 

 
 
 

2003 films
2003 action films
2003 action comedy films
2003 comedy films
2000s action adventure films
2000s adventure comedy films
2000s American films
2000s buddy comedy films
2000s English-language films
American action adventure films
American action comedy films
American adventure comedy films
American buddy action films
American buddy comedy films
Columbia Pictures films
Films directed by Peter Berg
Films produced by Marc Abraham
Films scored by Harry Gregson-Williams
Films set in Brazil
Films set in Los Angeles
Films shot in Hawaii
Films shot in Los Angeles
Films with screenplays by James Vanderbilt
Universal Pictures films
Works about bounty hunters
WWE Studios films